Randan is a type of boat.

Randan may also refer to:

 Randan, Puy-de-Dôme, France
 Château de Randan
 Randan, Kurdistan, Iran
 Randan, Tehran, Iran
 Fulvie de Randan, French court official